Atiur Rahman (born 3 August 1951) is a Bangladeshi development economist, writer and banker. He served as the 10th Governor of Bangladesh Bank, which is the central bank of Bangladesh. He has also been called "the banker of the poor" for his contributions in developing the economy of Bangladesh. Atiur Rahman is credited for instituting changes in the banking industry of Bangladesh that greatly increased the foreign exchange reserves of the country and brought massive automation and digitization in the banking sector of Bangladesh. Achievements during his tenure include the creation of the National Payment Switch of Bangladesh; introducing automated check clearing for banks in Bangladesh using local currency cheques; starting mobile banking, which lets people carry out banking transactions via SMS (text messages) or apps; establishing the Bangladesh Electronic Funds Transfer Network (BEFTN), which is a system of transferring money from one bank account directly to another bank without paper money ever changing hands; and installing the Bangladesh Automated Clearing House (BACH), which permits rapid electronic inter-bank transfers within the country with automatic adjustment of accounts. On 15 March 2016, he resigned as the governor of the central bank after the cyber hacking and theft of US$101 million in foreign reserves from the Bangladesh Bank account held at the Federal Reserve Bank of New York.

Early life and education

Atiur Rahman was born in a village in Jamalpur district on December 13, 1951. His father, who was a landless farmer, had received no schooling in his life. Rahman went to school but had to quit after third grade due to their financial situation.

He was able to resume his education shortly after, taking the final examination for sixth grade. After sixth grade, his principal showed him the Cadet Colleges' admission circular, for a better education. But Atiur Rahman did not want to. Eventually, he was admitted to Mirzapur Cadet College in seventh grade. A school teacher of the village, Foyez Moulavi, collected charity funds to facilitate his admission. Considering his financial inability, the college authority granted him free tuition. Thus he could continue at the college, where he passed the SSC and HSC examinations, securing positions in the merit list both times.

He earned BSS and MSS degrees in economics from the University of Dhaka. With a Commonwealth scholarship, he went to SOAS, University of London to complete his Ph.D. in 1977. His thesis later came out as a book under the title Peasants and Classes published by the Oxford University Press.

Career 

Rahman was a planning officer in the Bangladesh Tourism Corporation in 1975. In 1994, he established a development NGO under the title 'Unnayan Shamannay'. He had worked at the Bangladesh Institute of Development Studies in different capacities for nearly 28 years and retired as Senior Research Fellow on 4 April 2006. He also served as director of the state-owned Sonali Bank, the largest in Bangladesh.

In 2001, the government appointed him as the chairman of the board of directors of the Janata Bank, the second-largest in the country. In 2006, he joined the University of Dhaka in the Department of Development Studies as a professor. Also, he served in Mohammed Yunus' National Task Force on Poverty Eradication. He was also involved in the management of a number of socio-cultural organisations including Credit Development Forum, Monajatuddin Smriti Sangsad, Bangladesh Economic Association and Asiatic Society and Bangla Academy. Rahman focused his work in the area of poverty alleviation, engaging in first-hand research to find the causes of poverty and means of remedy. He worked specifically with shoal dwellers and poverty alleviation.
On 29 April 2009, Rahman was appointed as the 10th governor of Bangladesh Bank, the central bank of the country, for a tenure of four years. He assumed the title on 3 May 2009 and was reappointed until July 2016. After his tenure as a governor, he joined again the Department of Development Studies. The Dhaka University Syndicate appointed him as a 'Bangabandhu Chair' on 1 November 2019. Also, he is serving as a Chairperson of Unnayan Shamannay.

Governor of the central bank 

As governor of the central bank of Bangladesh, he took steps in developing the economy of his country by instituting programs such as women entrepreneurs loans, a loan for landless farmers and special programs around green finance. Rahman worked to bring automation and digitization into the banking sector of Bangladesh by creating the National Payment Switch of Bangladesh; introducing automated check clearing for banks in Bangladesh using local currency cheques; starting mobile banking, which lets people carry out banking transactions via SMS (text messages) or apps; establishing the Bangladesh Electronic Funds Transfer Network (BEFTN); instituting the Bangladesh Automated Clearing House (BACH), which permits rapid electronic inter-bank transfers within the country with automatic adjustment of accounts; etc. BEFTN is a system of transferring money from one bank account directly to another bank without paper money changing hands. The foreign exchange reserves of Bangladesh quadrupled during his tenure as governor of the central bank. In March 2016, Rahman resigned from his post following the 2016 Bangladesh Bank heist. He submitted his resignation letter to Prime Minister Sheikh Hasina on 15 March 2016. Fazle Kabir was selected as the new governor the same day. Before the resignation was made public, Rahman stated that he would resign if it would benefit his country.  Two days after his resignation, he returned to his position as professor at the Department of Development Studies at the University of Dhaka. Currently he is the 'Bangabandhu Professor' of University of Dhaka.

Publications 

Rahman is a regular newspaper columnist who often writes on poverty, public expenditure, economic development, public welfare, and other similar socio-economic issues. He has published 45 titles as of 2009, of which 16 are in English and 29 in Bengali. He writes books on different issues but mainly socio-economic issues, for example, his recent publication about Rabindranath Tagore's socio-economic thoughts compilation and research. Some of his publications and books are as follows:

Bengali language
 Nai Nai Voy, Hobe Hobe Joy, Panjeree, 
 Tabo Bhovone Tabo Bhovne: Anyaprokash, 
 Agami Diner Bangladesh: Ekusa sataker Unnayana Bhabana,  Pathak Samabes, 
 Alo andharer Bangladesh: Manab Unnayaner Sambhabana O Cyalenja, Mawla Bradarsa, 
 Apaunnayan: Samakalin Bangladesher Arthaniti, Samajniti, Pyapirasa, 
 Asahajoger Dinguli: Muktijuddher Prastutiparba, Sahitya Prokash, 
 Bangladesher Arek Nam: Bangabandhu Sheikh Mujib, Sahitya Prakash, 
 Bangladesher Unnayan Kon Pathe, Dipty Prokashony, 
 Bhasha Andolan Theke Muktijuddha: Atiur Rahmaner 7 Ti Grantha Pathaker Samikaran, Riddhi Prakash, 
 Bhashar Larai Bachar Larai, Nawroz Kitab Maha
 Bangobondhu Sohojpat, Chalochchitra O Prokashona Odhidoptor
 Janaganer Bajet: Amsagrahanamulaka Pariprekshita, Pathaka Samabesa, 
 Nirbachita Prabandha, Anyaprakash, 
 Muktijuddher Manush: Muktijuddher Swapna,Sahitya Prakash, 
 Susaner Sandhane Anyaprakas, 
 Svapnera Bangladesh, Khunje Phera, Dipti Prakasani, 
 Taba Bhubane Taba Vabane: Rabindranather Arthasamajik Vabana-bisayayak Racanasangkalan,Anyaprakash, 
 Unnayan alap: Arthaniti, Paribesa O Unnayana Bitarka, Pathaka Samabesa, 

English language
 Beel Dakatia: The Environmental Consequences of a Development Disaster,  University Press,  (984-05-1258-7)
 Early Impact of Grameen, a Multi-Dimensional Analysis: Outcome of a BIDS Research Study, Bangladesh Institute of Development Studies and Grameen Trust,  (984-31-1416-7)
 Education for Development: Lessons from East Asia for Bangladesh Institute of Southeast Asian Studies,  (981-230-132-1)
 Peasants and Classes: A Study in Differentiation in Bangladesh Zed Books, Limited,  (0-86232-346-0)
 Peasants and Classes: A Study in Differentiation in Bangladesh: Hardcover, Zed Books, Limited,  (0-86232-345-2)
 People's Report, 2002–2003, Bangladesh Environment by United Nations Development Programme,  Bangladesh, Unnayan Shamannay (Organization : Bangladesh)  Unnayan Shamannay,  (984-32-0866-8)
 People's Report, 2004–2005: Bangladesh Environment by United Nations Development Programme, Bangladesh, Unnayan Shamannay (Organization : Bangladesh)
 Sustainable Environment Management Programme (Bangladesh), Unnayan Shamannay,  (984-32-3225-9)

Awards and recognitions 

Rahman was awarded "Central Banker of the Year 2015" from the Asia-Pacific region, in recognition of his achievement in supporting lending to farmers and small and medium-sized enterprises (SMEs) without compromising growth and macroeconomic stability, by the London-based Financial Times owned magazine, The Banker; he was also awarded the  Central Bank Governor of the year 2015, Asia by The Emerging Markets Newspaper (UK based financial newspaper of the Euromoney Group).

The British Parliament lauded Rahman for women's empowerment on 8 March 2015.  Meanwhile, The Banker, a subsidiary monthly of the Financial Times of London, published captioned news with highlighting BB Governor Rahman in People Column of its March 2015 issue under the title "Movers and Shakers". He is the only Bangladeshi who gets the title.

In 2014, he received the GUSI Peace Prize International 2014 for his work in the field of economics focusing on the welfare of poor people. In 2012, he has been awarded a World No Tobacco Day Award by the World Health Organization (WHO).

Rahman was also awarded the "Indira Gandhi Gold Plaque" in 2011, the Atish Dipankar Gold Medal in 2000 and the Chandrabati Gold Medal in 2008.

Nepal's Prime Minister Sushil Koirala expressed his sincere gratitude to Rahman for extending CSR support towards victims of the disastrous earthquake in Nepal on 7 June 2015.

Rahman received "Dharitri Bangladesh National Award", presented by Dharitri Bangladesh, for the Bengali Year 1421 on 30 December 2015

Rahman was awarded one of the most prestigious awards in Bangladesh, the Bangla Academy Literary Award in 2016.
Rahman, an honorary professor of the University of Dhaka, was appointed 'Bangabandhu Chair' in 2019.

Personal life 

Rahman is married to Shahana Rahman, who is a professor of pediatrics at Bangabandhu Sheikh Mujib Medical University and they have three daughters.

See also 

 List of Bangladeshi people#Economists

References

External links 
 Official Website
 

Living people
1951 births
Bangladeshi economists
Mirzapur Cadet College alumni
University of Dhaka alumni
Academic staff of the University of Dhaka
Recipients of Bangla Academy Award
Governors of Bangladesh Bank
Honorary Fellows of Bangla Academy